Kostiantyn Viktorovich Kasianchuk (born 24 October 1979) is a Ukrainian retired professional ice hockey left wing who last played for HK Neman Grodno of the Belarusian Extraleague. Internationally he played for Ukraine in multiple World Championships.

Career statistics

External links

1979 births
Buran Voronezh players
Dynamo Balashikha players
HC Berkut-Kyiv players
HC CSKA Moscow players
HC Dynamo Moscow players
HC Khimik Voskresensk players
HK Neman Grodno players
HC Vityaz players
Living people
Sokil Kyiv players
Sportspeople from Kyiv
Traktor Chelyabinsk players
Ukrainian ice hockey left wingers